Olli Aitola (born February 3, 1992) is a Finnish ice hockey player who plays as a defenceman for KeuPa HT on loan from JYP Jyväskylä.

References

JYP Jyväskylä players
KeuPa HT players
JYP-Akatemia players
Finnish ice hockey defencemen
Sportspeople from Jyväskylä
1992 births
Living people
21st-century Finnish people